Alun Evans (born 17 February 1965) is an association football player who represented New Zealand at the international level.

Evans made his full All Whites debut in a 3–0 win over Fiji on 7 June 1992 and ended his international playing career with 17 A-international caps to his credit, his final cap coming in a 0–3 loss to Australia on 15 November 1995.

References

External links

1965 births
Living people
New Zealand association footballers
New Zealand international footballers
Brisbane Strikers FC players
Association football defenders
1996 OFC Nations Cup players